Juan Alves (25 March 1939 - 3 February 2009) was an Argentine cyclist who rode in the individual road race at the 1968 Summer Olympics.

References

External links
 

1939 births
2009 deaths
Argentine male cyclists
Olympic cyclists of Argentina
Cyclists at the 1968 Summer Olympics
Sportspeople from Mar del Plata